Anthony Frederick Bonner  (born 23 November 1943) is an Australian television, film and stage actor and singer. Bonner became famous in the 1960s children's television series Skippy the Bush Kangaroo, later moving on to lead roles in the dramas Cop Shop and Skyways.

Early life
Bonner was born in Manly, a northern beach suburb of Sydney. His grandfather, James Bonner, was a former Mayor of Manly and founding President of the Manly Life Saving Club. His father, Frederick Bonner, was a musical comedy actor at Her Majesty's Theatre, Sydney.

After leaving school he started work for a company supplying mannequins and other equipment for window dressing. He also worked part-time in his father's theatre as a wardrobe attendant, fostering his interest in acting.

Career

Acting
Bonner's first professional stage acting job was in 1961, aged 18. His first major role was as helicopter pilot Jerry King on the television series Skippy.

Bonner went on to appear in many Crawford Productions television series, including The Box, Matlock Police, Division 4, Cop Shop, Skyways, and Carson's Law.

In 1970–71, he had a guest role in one episode of the UK-based ITC television series The Persuaders! starring Tony Curtis and Roger Moore. He featured in an advertising campaign for the Ballajura real estate development in Western Australia in the late 1970s.

His notable film roles include Eyewitness (1970), You Can't Win 'Em All (1970), Creatures the World Forgot (1971), Inn of the Damned (1975), The Mango Tree (1977), Money Movers (1978), The Man from Snowy River (1982), The Highest Honor (1983), Quigley Down Under (1990), Dead Sleep (1990), Hurricane Smith (1992), and Liquid Bridge (2003). He has twice portrayed Australian World War I soldier Murray Bourchier, to whom he bears a remarkable likeness, in the 1987 film The Lighthorsemen and a 1993 episode of The Young Indiana Jones Chronicles (which also used footage from The Lighthorsemen).

Bonner also starred in the 1985 TV mini-series Anzacs alongside Paul Hogan, Jon Blake, Andrew Clarke, and Megan Williams. Bonner played Lieutenant (later Captain) Harold Armstrong, commanding officer of the 8th Battalion (Australia) of the First Australian Imperial Force in 1914, from the Gallipoli in 1915 to the Western Front in Belgium and France. The series was a huge rating success when it aired on the Nine Network.

Bonner also does advertising work, such as playing veteran burger-naming expert Ken Thomas in a 2007 McDonald's ad campaign.

In September 2008, Bonner sued Fauna Productions Pty Ltd, the production company for Skippy the Bush Kangaroo, seeking residuals from merchandising and DVD sales.

In June 2013, Bonner was involved in ongoing talks of collaborating with actors Billy White and Tyler De Nawi on an Australian crime noir film titled "HUCK".

More recently, he acted in the low-budget films William Kelly's War (2014) and Landfall (2017), both filmed and produced in Australia.

Musicals
Bonner recorded a cover version of the Bee Gees song "Wine and Women" in 1968. He later appeared with Barry Gibb on an episode of Bandstand. Later in his career Bonner appeared in several stage musicals including Annie Get Your Gun and How to Succeed in Business Without Really Trying.

Personal life
Bonner is patron of several charities including The Smith Family and the Wesley Mission suicide prevention program. He has also served on the board of the Variety Club and is Publicity Officer and past President of the Manly Life Saving Club.

Bonner was married to Australian actress and model Nola Clark from 1972 to 1992. They had three daughters. One daughter, Chelsea Bonner, is the owner and director of the plus-size model agency BELLA Model Management.

In 2017 Bonner was appointed a Member of the Order of Australia for significant service to the performing arts as an actor, to surf lifesaving, and to the community through charitable organisations.

References

External links 

 

1943 births
Living people
Australian male film actors
Australian male stage actors
Australian male television actors
Members of the Order of Australia
People from Manly, New South Wales